Samuel Johnson (July 7, 1839March 1, 1916) was a Michigan politician.

Early life
Johnson was born on July 7, 1839 in Springfield, New York to parents Squire and Adelia Halstead Johnson. Johnson attended Cazenovia Seminary in New York. Johnson moved to Michigan in 1864.

Career
On November 7, 1876, Johnson was elected to the Michigan House of Representatives where he represented the Cass County district from January 3, 1877 to 1880. Johnson worked as a farmer and a teacher.

Personal life
Johnson was a member of the Methodist Episcopal Church.

Death
Johnson died of pneumonia in Wayne County, Michigan on March 1, 1916.

References

1839 births
1916 deaths
Methodists from Michigan
19th-century Methodists
20th-century Methodists
Deaths from pneumonia in Michigan
Farmers from Michigan
Republican Party members of the Michigan House of Representatives
People from Springfield, New York
Cazenovia College alumni
19th-century American politicians